The 2020 Shanghai Dragons season was the third season of the Shanghai Dragons's existence in the Overwatch League and their first under head coach Moon Byung-chul. The Dragons planned to host two homestand weekends in the 2020 season at XinYeFang Studio in Shanghai's Jing'an District. However, due to the COVID-19 pandemic, the all homestand events were cancelled by the league.

Preceding offseason

Organizational changes 
In September 2019, the Dragons parted ways with head coach We "BlueHaS" Seong-hwan and assistant coach Jeong "Levi" Chung-Hyeok. The team promoted Moon Byung-chul, who was the head coach of the Dragons' academy team Team CC, to the head coach of the Dragons. In November, it was announced that the Dragons signed Dong-soo "Dongsu" Shin and former London Spitfire coach former Los Angeles Valiant coach Jeong-min "Jfeel" Kim as assistant coaches.

Roster changes 
The Dragons enter the new season with one free agent, seven players which they have the option to retain for another year, and two players under contract. The OWL's deadline to exercise a team option is November 11, after which any players not retained will become a free agent. Free agency officially began on October 7.

Acquisitions 
The Dragon's first pick up of the offseason was announced on November 12 with the acquisition of DPS Kim "Fleta" Byung-sun from the Seoul Dynasty. The team announced their full roster on November 26, which included the additions of main tank Seo "Stand1" Ji-won from Gladiators Legion, former Los Angeles Gladiators off-tank Kang "Void" Jun-woo, support Lee "LeeJaeGon" Jae-gon from RunAway, and DPS Lee "LIP" Jae-won from Blossom. The team promoted tank player Lee "Fearless" Eui-seok from their academy team Team CC on January 19.

Departures 
The Dragon's first departure was on October 23, when they chose not to exercise their option to retain DPS Jin "YOUNGJIN" Young-jin. Shanghai announced that they would not re-sign their only free agent, Noh "Gamsu" Young-jin, on November 4. Four days later, support Son "CoMa" Kyung-woo was released from the team. The Dragons announced on January 19 that off-tank player Lee "Envy" Kang-jae was released from the team.

Homestand events 
In August 2019, the Dragons announced that they would hold two homestand events; both were to be held at XinYeFang Studio in Shanghai's Jing'an District. Due to the COVID-19 pandemic, the Dragons decided to relocate their team to South Korea with no specific return time. Additionally, the league cancelled all February and March matches planned in China, which cancelled the Dragons's first homestand on February 15 to 16. The cancelled matches will be rescheduled for later in the season. The Overwatch League announced that the cancelled homestand events in China would be rescheduled for Weeks 5 through 7 in a studio in Seoul, South Korea; however, due to the COVID-19 pandemic in South Korea, these matches were cancelled as well.

Roster

Standings

Game log

Regular season

Midseason tournaments 

| style="text-align:center;" | Bonus wins awarded: 8

Postseason

References 

Shanghai Dragons
Shanghai Dragons
Shanghai Dragons seasons